is a former Japanese football player.

Playing career
Yabusaki was born in Chiba on June 1, 1978. After graduating from high school, he joined his local club Kashiwa Reysol in 1997. However he could not play at all in the match until 1999. On November 18, 2000, he debuted against Kawasaki Frontale. However he could hardly play in the match in 6 seasons and retired end of 2002 season.

Club statistics

References

External links

1978 births
Living people
Association football people from Chiba Prefecture
Japanese footballers
J1 League players
Kashiwa Reysol players
Association football midfielders